The Security Group for the Presidency of the Republic (GSPR) is the security unit in charge of the safety of the President of the French Republic. Established in 1983, it is part of both the National Gendarmerie and National Police. It is distinct from the Republican Guard, which is in charge of the security of official buildings.

History
In the past, the group was composed of 30 members of the National Gendarmerie and 30 members of the National Police, commanded by a lieutenant colonel of the Gendarmerie or a Commissaire divisionnaire de Police, alternately in charge. Since 2019, the Director of the GSPR has been Georges Salinas of the National Police, assisted by colonel Benoît Ferrand of the National Gendarmerie.

During the presidency of Nicolas Sarkozy, the unit was only composed of policemen from the Service de la protection and from the Recherche Assistance Intervention Dissuasion (RAID) unit. During his administration, the unit had 90 members because of higher threat levels. No Gendarmerie officers were selected to be in the unit as Sarkozy believed he should not be protected by the military.

Gendarmerie officers came back to the unit after the election of François Hollande in 2012. In December 2012, there were about 20 gendarmes detached from the GIGN. The group has since then been composed of 60 members again.

Equipment
In addition to an extensive fleet, GSPR members are armed with the following weapons:
 ASP expandable baton;
 Glock 17 pistol;
 Glock 26 pistol;
 Heckler & Koch MP5 sub-machine guns;
 Brügger & Thomet MP9 sub-machine guns;
 Heckler & Koch G36 assault rifles.

References

French Gendarmerie
GIGN
National Police (France)
Protective security units
1983 establishments in France